The vermilion box is a hypothetical portable improvised line emulator.

Its function is to spoof not only caller ID but every other aspect of an incoming telephone call, including ringing and DC line voltage.  Typically, the user physically disconnects the target line from the telephone network, connects the vermilion box, and then proceeds to create a completely bogus telephone call.

The vermilion box incorporates three more basic phreaking boxes: the magenta box, which generates the AC ringing signal required to make the target telephone ring; the orange box, which generates caller ID (although it is not a proper call-waiting caller ID orange box that is used but a modified orange box that generates on-hook (idle state) caller ID); and the beige box that is used to conduct the actual conversation.  In addition, a DC power source is required to power the telephones on the target's line.

This is a very risky and stealth-intensive technique that requires the user to physically connect to the target line, anywhere between the premises of the target and the local exchange.  However, properly applied, it will result in an incoming call to the target line that is completely indistinguishable from a genuine call and which cannot possibly be traced.

The vermilion box is named, following the tradition of naming phreaking boxes after colors, for a color (vermilion) that is similar to a combination of the color names of two of the component phreaking boxes from which this box is made: orange and magenta.

See also 
 Analog telephone adapter, a device which makes a Voice over IP connection appear to be a standard outside line. These boxes generate ringing voltage, DC line voltage, dial tone and caller ID to create one or two virtual telephone lines. In theory, a two-line adapter configured for ringdown (where taking one side off-hook causes the other to ring, displaying a pre-configured caller ID name or number) could serve as a line emulator, requiring only a handset and DC power source.

External links 
 The original Vermilion Box

Phreaking boxes